Lutz van der Horst (born 20 August 1975) is a German television presenter and comedian. He is most known for being a political satire reporter on the heute-show.

Biography
Born in Cologne, van der Horst studied English studies and German studies at University of Cologne. He then initially worked as a speaker and author for radio, such as appearing on the "Bürgerfunk" show on Radio Cologne, where he also worked on the youth magazine "Mehr von mehr". Then he did an internship at 1LIVE radio station.

Then from 2000 working on television, he worked as a gag writer for the Cologne-based production company 'Brainpool' like Die Wochenshow, Rent a Pocher and TV total. He then worked as a freelance writer for other comedy shows such as Switch Reloaded (versions of the Australian TV series Fast Forward), comedy sketch show Sechserpack and Harald Schmidt.

From December 2001, Van der Horst also appeared for the first time in front of the camera. On the ProSieben network Show TV total, he appeared in a pink rabbit costume as a bubble hare blowing a carrot.

Together with Manuel Butt and Thomas Rogel, who later was also a writer for the heute-show (Today show) in 2008, they founded the office N2O Comedy in 2008. Note  is the chemical formula for nitrous oxide.

Van der Horst has also been cast member of the German late-night satirical television program Heute-show since 2009. He is nicknamed the "Political Terror".

Then from 2011 to 2012, he and Senna Gammour hosted the quiz show Iss oder quizz (based on the American show Deal with It) on the ZDF channel.

In 2012, he worked as a reporter in Monika Grubers boulevard satire Leute, Leute! on German public broadcast ZDF. Since 2013 he with (memory trainer) Christiane Stenger have been hosting Wie werd' ich …? (or How will I ...?) on German broadcaster ZDFneo. The show tries to explain scientific phenomena with humor.

On the radio 1LIVE and on stage, he has an unsuccessful stand-up comedian persona named 'Jimmy Breuer' Germany's worst comedian, who has deliberately wrong punch times at the wrong time, is the exact opposite of a skilled joke professional. He has toured with 'Jimmy Breuer' such as 36 shows in 2011.

Since September 2016, he plays the prison supervisor "Frosch" in Johann Strauss's operetta Die Fledermaus at the Hessisches Staatstheater Wiesbaden.

In November 2016, the AfD in Bayern used his face for a campaign poster, for the cancellation of TV broadcasting fees, without his permission. He used his position as satire-external reporter on the "Heute Show" to criticize the political party. He tried to sue them for 5000 euros in damages, but eventually got seven euros and ten cents from members outside the party congress.

In 2018, a new SAT.1 show was created, "Hotel Herzklopfen - Late in love!" (based on a Belgian show) presented by Van der Horst, Sarah Mangione and Daniel Boschmann.

Personal life
He lives in Ehrenfeld, Cologne and is a member of the SPD in the context of a satirical heute-show contribution in 2016, which he has renounced since.
He supports equality of lesbians and gays.
He is a big fan of horror films and has a very extensive collection of zombie and cannibal films from the late 1970s.

Filmography

Film

TV

Awards 
 2007: Deutscher Comedypreis as writer at Switch Reloaded (category best sketch-show)
 2010: Adolf-Grimme-Preis as member and writer of heute-show (category entertainment)
 2010: Deutscher Fernsehpreis as member and writer of heute-show (category best comedy)
 2010: Deutscher Comedypreis as member and writer of heute-show (category best comedy-Show)
 2011: Deutscher Comedypreis as member and writer of heute-show (category best comedy-Show)
 2012: Deutscher Comedypreis as member and writer of heute-show (category best comedy-Show)
 2014: Deutscher Fernsehpreis as member and writer of heute-show (category best Comedy)
 2016: Goldene Henne as member and writer of heute-show (category politics)
 2017: Goldene Kamera as member and writer by heute-show (category best satire-show)

References

External links 
 Official website
 Kölner Stadtanzeiger: "Der Kölner Lenauplatz ist der friedlichste Platz der Welt" (in German)
 Berliner Kurier: Mama findet mich manchmal peinlich ! (in German)
 Stuttgarter Zeitung: Zehn Gründe, warum wir uns auf die "Heute Show" freuen (in German)
 Berliner Zeitung: Lutz van der Horst, Die charmante Nervensäge von der Heute-Show (in German)

21st-century German male actors
German male comedians
1975 births
Actors from Cologne
Living people
German male film actors
German male television actors
University of Cologne alumni
21st-century comedians